Nicolae Panu (born 18 December 1969) is a Moldavian professional football manager and former footballer. Since September 2015 he is the head coach of Moldavian football club FC Saxan.

References

External links
 
 

1969 births
Living people
Footballers from Chișinău
Soviet footballers
Moldovan footballers
Moldovan football managers
Association footballers not categorized by position
Moldovan Super Liga managers